The Marsh Award for Children's Literature in Translation was a literary prize awarded in the United Kingdom from 1996 until 2017 to the translator of an outstanding work of fiction for young readers translated into English.

The award was given every two years and is sponsored by the Marsh Christian Trust.  The award was administered from 1996 by the National Centre for Research in Children's Literature at Roehampton University, and subsidised in its early years by the Arts Council of England. From 2008 the award was administered by the English-Speaking Union.

Winners
2017 - Helen Wang for Bronze and Sunflower, translated from the Chinese of Cao Wenxuan
2015 – Margaret Jull Costa for The Adventures of Shola, translated from Spanish; originally Basque language by Bernardo Atxaga
2013 – Howard Curtis for In the Sea There Are Crocodiles, from  the Italian of Fabio Geda
2011 – Martin Cleaver for Letters to Anyone and Everyone, from the Dutch of Toon Tellegen
2009 – Sarah Ardizzone (née Adams) for Toby Alone, from the French of Timothée de Fombelle
2007 – Anthea Bell for The Flowing Queen, from the German of Kai Meyer
2005 – Sarah Adams for Eye of the Wolf, from the French of Daniel Pennac
2003 – Anthea Bell for Where Were You Robert?, from the German of Hans Magnus Enzensberger
2001 – Betsy Rosenberg  for Duel, from the Hebrew of David Grossman
1999 – Patricia Crampton for  The Final Journey, from the German of Gudrun Pausewang
1996 – Anthea Bell for  A Dog's Life, translated from the German of Christine Nöstlinger

Shortlists
2017
Oh, Freedom!, by Francesco D'Adamo, translated by Siân Williams (translator) DARF Publishers - Italian
The First Case, by Ulf Nilsson, translated by Julia Marshall (Gecko Press) - Swedish
The Flying Classroom, by Erich Kastner, translated by Anthea Bell (Pushkin Children's Books) - German 
Bronze and Sunflower, by Cao Wenxuan, translated by Helen Wang (Walker Books) - Chinese
The Secret of the Blue Glass, by Tomiko Inui, translated by Ginny Tapley Takemori (Pushkin Children's Books) - Japanese 
Little Black Fish, by Samed Behrangi, translated by Azita Rassi (Tiny Owl Publishing) - Persian

2015
 Waffle Hearts, by Maria Parr, translated by Guy Puzey (Walker Books, 2013) - Norwegian 
The Letter for the King, by Tonke Dragt, translated by Laura Watkinson (Pushkin Children’s Books, 2014) - Dutch
My Brother Simple, by Marie-Aude Murail, translated Adriana Hunter (Bloomsbury Children’s Books, 2012) - French
The Good Little Devil and Other Tales, by Pierre Gripari, translated by Sophie Lewis (Andersen Press, 2013) - French
Anton and Piranha, by Milena Baisch, translated by Chantal Wright (Andersen Press, 2013) - German
The Adventures of Shola, by Bernardo Atxaga, translated by Margaret Jull Costa (Pushkin Children’s Books, 2013) - Basque

2013
In The Sea, by Fabio Geda, translated by Howard Curtis (David Fickling Books) - Italian
The Little Prince, by Antoine de Saint-Exupéry, translated by Ros Schwartz and Chloe Schwartz (The Collector’s Library) - French
My Own Special Way, by Mithaa Alkhayyat, translated by Fatima Sharafeddini (Orion Children’s Books) - Arabic
Themba, by Lutz van Dijk, translated by Karin Chubb (Aurora Metro Books) - German 
The Midnight Palace, by Carlos Ruiz Zafron, translated by Lucia Graves (Orion Children’s Books) - Spanish

2011
The Pasta Detectives, by Andreas Steinhöfel, translated by Chantal Wright (The Chicken House, 2010) - German
Letters to Anyone and Everyone, by Toon Tellegen, translated by Martin Cleaver (Boxer Books Ltd, 2009) - Dutch
No and Me by Delphine de Vigan, translated by George Miller (Bloomsbury Publishing, 2010) - French
David's Story by Stig Dalager, translated by Frances Østerfelt & Cheryl Robson (Aurora Metro Publications, 2010) - Danish

2009
My Brother Johnny, by Francesco D'Adamo, translated by Sian Williams (translator) (Aurora Metro Press, 2007) - Italian
When the Snow Fell, by Henning Mankell, translated by Laurie Thompson (Andersen Press, 2007) - Swedish 
Letters from Alain, by Enrique Perez Diaz, translated by Simon Breden (Aurora Metro Press, 2008) - Spanish
Tina's Web, by Alki Zei, translated by John Thornley (Aurora Metro Press, 2007) - Greek
Toby Alone, by Timothée de Fombelle, translated by Sarah Ardizzone (Walker Books, 2008) - French
Message in a Bottle by Valérie Zenatti, translated by Adriana Hunter (Bloomsbury Children's, 2008) - French

2007
The Flowing Queen, by Kai Meyer, translated by Anthea Bell - German
The Book of Everything, by Guus Kuijer, translated by John Nieuwenhuizen - Dutch
A Bridge to the Stars, by Henning Mankell, translated by Laurie Thompson - Swedish
Dragon Rider by Cornelia Funke, translated by Anthea Bell - German
Just Like Tomorrow, by Faiza Guène, translated by Sarah Adams - French
Mimus, by Lilli Thal, translated by John Brownjohn - German

2005
The Thief Lord, by Cornelia Funke, translated by Oliver Latsch (The Chicken House, 2004) - German
The Shamer's Signet, by Lene Kaaberbol, translated by the author (Hodder Children's Books, 2003) - Danish
Playing with Fire, by Henning Mankell, translated by Anna Paterson (Allen & Unwin, 2002) - Swedish
Eye of the Wolf, by Daniel Pennac, translated by Sarah Adams (Walker Books, 2002) - French
Kamo's Escape by Daniel Pennac, translated by Sarah Adams (Walker Books, 2004) - French

2003
The Shamer's Daughter, by Lene Kaaberbol, translated by the author (Hoodder)  - Danish
Brothers, by Ted van Lieshout, translated by Lance Salway (Collins) - Dutch
Dog, by Daniel Pennac, translated by Sarah Adams (Walker Books) - French
Where were you, Robert?, by Hans Magnus Enzensberger, translated by Anthea Bell (Puffin) - German
Bambert’s Book of Missing Stories, by Reinhardt Jung, translated by Anthea Bell (Egmont) - German

Multiple-award winners

Anthea Bell has won the Marsh Award three times (1996, 2003, 2007). Sarah Ardizzone (formerly Sarah Adams) has won the Marsh Award twice (2005, 2009).

Anthea Bell and Patricia Crampton have both won the Mildred L. Batchelder Award, which is the American Library Association's annual award for translated children's books (inaugurated in 1968) and conferred upon "the publisher". Bell translated four Batchelder Award-winning books between 1976 and 1995, and Patricia Crampton translated the Batchelder winners of 1984 and 1987.

References

External links

Marsh Award for Children's Literature in Translation at the English Speaking Union website
Marsh Award for Children's Literature in Translation at the Marsh Christian Trust website
 Marsh Award at Scottish Book Trust
 National Centre for Research in Children's Literature

 
British children's literary awards
Children's literary awards
Awards established in 1996
1996 establishments in the United Kingdom
Translation awards